Oxton is a village in Nottinghamshire, England, with a 568 residents at the 2011 census. It is located 5 miles west of Southwell, 5 miles north of Lowdham, 10 miles NE of Nottingham and 2 miles NE of Calverton, and lies on the B6386, and is very close to the A6097 trunk road.

Oxton has a church dedicated to St Peter & St Paul; a post office and two pubs. Oxton also has two fords – a small ford within the village itself, and a much larger ford on Beanford Lane – often as deep as 1 ft whilst remaining open to all traffic. It is however closed each March, so that the toads found in the swamp-like area, which the ford crosses, can breed.

Toponymy
Oxton seems to contain the Old English word for an ox, oxa, + tūn (Old English), an enclosure; a farmstead; a village; an estate.., so  'Ox farm or settlement'.

Notable resident
Robert St Vincent Sherbrooke, awarded the Victoria Cross, was born in Oxton.

Bus services

NottsBus

747: Oxton – Calverton – Lowdham

References

External links

Newark and Sherwood
Villages in Nottinghamshire